Anne Heaton may refer to:

 Anne Heaton (ballet dancer) (1930–2020), British ballet dancer and teacher
 Anne Heaton (folk singer), American folk singer-songwriter